Tabarka is a coastal town located in north-western Tunisia, close to the border with Algeria. Tabarka's history is a mosaic of Berber, Punic, Hellenistic, Roman, Arabic, Genoese and Turkish culture. The town is dominated by an offshore rock on which there remains a Genoese castle. Nationalist leader Habib Bourguiba, later president of post-independence Tunisia, was exiled on Tabarka by the French colonial authorities in 1952.  Tourist attractions include coral fishing, the Coralis Festival of underwater photography, and its annual jazz festival.

Name
This was transcribed into Greek as Thaúbraka and into Latin as Thabraca. In modern day Berber it is known as Tabarka or Tbarga, while its Arabic name is Ṭbarqa.

History

Although older sources placed Thabraca within the Roman province of Numidia, recent ones agree on placing it in the Roman province of Africa, known also as Africa Proconsularis. It was a Roman colony. It was connected by a road with Simitthu, which it served as a port for the export of its famous marble. The rebellious Roman official Gildo, the brother of Firmus, committed suicide in Thabraca. Under the Vandal king Gaiseric, the town had a monastery for men and a convent for women.

In 1540 the island was given by the Ottoman Bey of Tunis as a concession to the Genoese Lomellini family. The Genoese were in the service of Spain during 1553 at the request of Emperor Charles V who was interested in coral fishing. The Lomellini were part of the circle of Andrea Doria, Doge of Genoa, and were related to the Grimaldi family. The grant was possibly due to a secret ransom for the release of the pirate Turkish Dragut, captured in 1540 by Giannettino Doria, nephew of Andrea Doria. The Lomellini colonized Tabarca with a group of inhabitants of Pegli, near Genoa, where they had various properties and a huge palace. The community of Pegliesi lived in Tabarka for several centuries.

In 1738 due to the exhaustion of the coral reefs and the deterioration of relations with the Arab population a large group of "Tabarkini" moved to San Pietro Island off Sardinia, then uninhabited, where they founded a new town of Carloforte. The transfer was made possible thanks to the King of Sardinia, Charles Emmanuel III of Sardinia who wanted to colonize those of his lands which were not yet inhabited. The name of Carloforte was chosen in honor of the sovereign. Another group of Tabarkini was resettled in the town of Calasetta on the adjacent Island of Sant'Antioco, whose population still speaks a variant of Genoese dialect originating from Tabarka. Others were moved to the Spanish island of New Tabarca. In 1741 or 1742, the Genoese fortress surrendered to the (nominally Ottoman but essentially autonomous) Bey of Tunis. At Tabarka, the ruins consists of a pit once used as a church and some fragments of walls which belonged to Christian buildings. There were also two Ottoman Turkish fortresses, one of which has been repaired.

Under French colonial rule it was annexed to the civil district of Souk el-Arba, now in the Tunisian governorate of Jendouba, and a rather important fishing centre. Tabarka Jazz Festival was established in 1973.

Ecclesiastical history

Thabraca became a Christian bishopric that is no longer a residential see but is included in the Catholic Church's list of titular sees.

 was also the seat of an ancient Bishopric and in antiquity it had a monastery for men and one for women, and several church Buildings and Christian cemeteries have been uncovered. The city contains several Christian cemeteries, many of the tombs covered with curious mosaics. An inscription (C.I.L., VIII, 173-82) mentions the cult of the martyr Anastasia and her companions.

Bishops

The bishops of Thabraca, who met with the other bishops of Proconsular Africa, included:
Victoricus, at the Council of Carthage (256)
Rusticianus, at the conference of Carthage in 411, where his competitor was the Donatist Charentius; he also signed in 416 the letter from the council of Proconsular Africa to Pope Innocent I;
Clarissimus, who in 646 signed the letter from the same Council to Patriarch Paul II of Constantinople against the Monothelites.
The Bishopric was founded during the Roman Empire and survived through the arian Vandal and Orthodox Byzantine empires, only ceasing to function with the Muslim conquest of the Maghreb. The diocese was re-founded in name at least in the 20th century as a titular see of the Roman Catholic church.

Titular bishops

Pierre Brigot, (22 Jan 1755 Appointed – 8 Nov 1791)
St. Louis Gabriel Taurin Dufresse, (24 Jul 1798 Appointed – 14 Sep 1815)
Edward Kernan (6 Feb 1818 Appointed – 19 Nov 1824)
Rémi Gaulin † (10 May 1833 Appointed – 14 Jan 1840 Succeeded, Bishop of Kingston, Ontario)
Bernardino di Milia, (27 Mar 1884 Appointed – 4 Jun 1891)
Antonin Guillermain, (12 Jan 1895 Appointed – 14 Jul 1896)
Henri Streicher, (1 Feb 1897 Appointed – 2 Jun 1933)
Auguste-Joseph-Marie Cogneau (23 Jun 1933 Appointed – 12 Apr 1952)
Georges Kettel, (24 Mar 1953 Appointed – 10 Nov 1959)
Charles Quentin Bertram Olwell, (19 Jan 1961 Appointed – 30 Jan 1972)
Antônio Agostinho Marochi (27 Sep 1973 Appointed – 2 Feb 1976)
Sebastian Acol Dalis (18 Nov 1987 Appointed – 27 Oct 2004 Died)
Pedro Joaquin Hernández Cantarero, (12 Feb 2005 Appointed – )

Weather

Climate
The weather in Tabarka is usually variable from year to year. Summers are mostly hot and dry, but milder than the Saharan hinterland. It barely rains in July and August. Winters are mostly rainy and cold. Snow is possible during this time of the year.

Transport
The airport in Tabarka was named Airport 7 Novembre until the Tunisian revolution; it was then renamed Tabarka-Ain Draham International Airport.

See also

Tabarka Rocks
Tabarka Jazz Festival
Fossa regia
 Genoese-Tabarka diaspora
 Calasetta
 San Pietro Island
 Carloforte
 Tabarca
European enclaves in North Africa before 1830
Featured in film, The Golden Salamander, with Trevor Howard, Herbert Lom and Anouk Aimee.{Paul Thomson}

Gallery

References

Citations

Notes

Bibliography

 
 . 
 .

External links

 Tabarka.Com Tabarka Guide
 Tabarka.Org
 Photo gallery of Tabarka in 1924. French Naval Intelligence
 WorldStatesmen-Tunisia
 

Communes of Tunisia
Populated places in Jendouba Governorate
Populated coastal places in Tunisia
Ottoman Tunisia
Thabraca
Territories of the Republic of Genoa
Phoenician colonies in Tunisia